Karl "Gösta" Åsbrink (18 November 1881 – 19 April 1966) was a Swedish gymnast and modern pentathlete who won a gold medal in the 1908 Summer Olympics and a silver medal in the 1912 Summer Olympics.

Åsbrink's 1908 gold medal was won in London for a team event, as the Swedish men's gymnastics team came in first. Four years later, competing before a home audience in 1912 Stockholm, he won an individual silver medal in the first contested Modern pentathlon of the Olympic Games. Åsbrink was a lieutenant of Swedish Army at the time and was later promoted to a major.

References

External links

Gösta Åsbrink listed among Swedish Olympic medalists

1881 births
1966 deaths
Swedish male modern pentathletes
Swedish male artistic gymnasts
Gymnasts at the 1908 Summer Olympics
Modern pentathletes at the 1912 Summer Olympics
Olympic modern pentathletes of Sweden
Olympic gymnasts of Sweden
Olympic gold medalists for Sweden
Olympic silver medalists for Sweden
Sportspeople from Stockholm
Olympic medalists in gymnastics
Olympic medalists in modern pentathlon
Medalists at the 1912 Summer Olympics
Medalists at the 1908 Summer Olympics